The 1967 Mississippi gubernatorial election took place on November 7, 1967, in order to elect the Governor of Mississippi. Incumbent Democrat Paul B. Johnson Jr. was term-limited, and could not run for reelection to a second term.

Democratic primary
No candidate received a majority in the Democratic primary, which featured seven contenders, so a runoff was held between the top two candidates.

It was the first Democratic primary for the governorship since the Civil Rights Act of 1964 and the Voting Rights Act of 1965, resulting in an increased registration for black voters from 29,500 to 195,000, making overt segregationist rhetoric less acceptable, as the Citizens' Councils complained by asking the contestants "why our ideals of states' rights and racial segregation" were not being "featured in this campaign as in the past." On the other hand, the abolition of poll tax benefited many poor whites, most of whom were supporters of segregation. As a result, each one of the seven candidates aired support for segregation, although to varying degrees.

Waller, who prosecuted Byron De La Beckwith and attacked the Ku Klux Klan, additionally railed against civil rights "rabble-rousers.” He was the more moderate candidate on the race question along with Winter, who had to embrace segregationist rhetoric to stay in the race.

Barnett attempted to do a comeback, but more militant segregationists complained he did not do enough during the Ole Miss riot of 1962. Staunch segregationist Williams ironically used the least rhetoric since he could claim to have sacrificed his House career for Goldwater three years ago in 1964, although his supporters handed out flyers stating that "if William F. Winter is elected governor, the Negroes will run Mississippi."

The most openly segregationist candidate was Jimmy Swan, running on a promise to establish "FREE, private, SEGREGATED SCHOOLS for every white child in the State of Mississippi" in the first twelve months of his term, or else he would resign and publicly apologize. He proposed to save Mississippi "from the moral degeneracy of total mass integration that Washington has decreed for our children this fall", saying that granting equality to the blacks was to make savagery the equal of civilization and promising to use extreme force against any black urban riot, which he viewed as a "Communist monster", and openly courted the Klan, of which his campaign bodyguard Pat Massengale was a member. Such rhetoric might have contributed to the relatively less extremist voters moving to vote for Barnett, viewed as more moderate, and similarly winning most extreme segregationists from Barnett Swan always wore a white suit to demonstrate his beliefs on race.

Vernon E. Brown, a 65-year-old tax assessor from Stone County, Mississippi, and C. L. McKinley, a Creole pipefitter living in Pennsylvania, had no campaign organization.

The runoff election was won by U.S. Representative John Bell Williams, who defeated state treasurer William Winter.

As was common at the time, the Democratic primary had higher turnout than the general election, as it was a given the Democrat would win. Black leaders avoided publicly supporting a candidate, out of fear that the candidate might lose votes. In some places, the MFDP called on blacks to boycott the primaries.

Results

Runoff

General election

Campaign
Phillips, a former Democratic public service commissioner, had no running-mate. His previous nominee for lieutenant governor, Stanford Morse, endorsed Williams. Phillips later said that the GOP did not at the time realize the importance of offering full candidate slates. The unopposed Democratic nominee for lieutenant governor, Charles L. Sullivan of Clarksdale, had defeated in his party's primary Governor Paul Johnson, who ran in 1967 for his former post of lieutenant governor. At the time Mississippi governors could not succeed themselves but could sit out a term and enter the next race four years later. Sullivan earlier said that he could work with either Phillips or Williams, but he endorsed the Democratic nominee, having verbally sparred with Phillips at a meeting in Biloxi of the Mississippi Manufacturing Association.
 
Clarke Reed of Greenville, who succeeded Yerger as state chairman in 1966, recalled that Phillips did not wish to run for governor again in 1967 but was persuaded to do so my party leaders in need of a candidate though there was little expectation of success. For his second race, Phillips shed his past segregationist image and ran to the middle, as had Williams' unsuccessful primary opponent, state Treasurer William F. Winter, who ultimately won the governorship in 1979. Time magazine called Phillips "an erstwhile segregationist who this year appealed for an end to the racial rancor." Phillips later said that his moderate stance hurt the Republicans at that time but that the party since "benefited from the things we did."
 
In a television address, Phillips reaffirmed his belief in segregation but spoke in conciliatory language toward African Americans:
 
The influence of race ... is so dominant that it is utterly unrealistic to expect any significant progress in such vital fields as education, economic development, and federal-state relations until we have brought the race issue out into the open and begun, at least begun, to deal with it effectively. ... I advocate spending money to develop our underdeveloped human resources ... with the expectation of getting all that money back ... With God's help and your help, I will bring peace and harmony and material progress to Mississippi.
 
The Meridian Star charged that Phillips had "made it plain that he is no conservative. He is a member of the Republican Party, not just here ... but at the national level." The Clarion-Ledger judged Phillips' in his second race as "a weak candidate with a weak pitch" and termed his prospects as virtually "hopeless."
 
Phillips took other heretical positions, having urged a "long-range master plan for education" and the reinstatement of compulsory attendance, which had been repealed in 1958. Phillips questioned the need of the Mississippi Milk Commission, which he said kept the price of milk artificially too high.
 
Presidential politics played some role in the 1967 campaign, as Williams stressed his friendship with George C. Wallace of Alabama, who was preparing for an independent candidacy in 1968. Phillips countered that only a Republican, perhaps Nixon or Governor    Ronald Wilson Reagan of California, could defeat a national Democratic presidential nominee. Reagan cut a campaign commercial for Phillips; Maureen Reagan made some twenty appearances on Phillips' behalf at various places in the state. Neighboring Governor Winthrop Rockefeller of Arkansas, younger brother of Nelson Rockefeller, spoke in Corinth and assisted Phillips in fundraising. Phillips raised $300,000 in the 1967 race.
 
Williams rejected Phillips' pleas for debates, as had Paul Johnson in 1963. In fact, the congressman spent few days on the general election campaign trail and urged friends "to do the campaigning for me." Williams, who had lost the lower part of his left arm while service in the United States Army Air Corps during World War II, was hospitalized during the campaign with a leg ailment, which also stemmed from war injuries. At a $40 per person fundraiser attended by some five thousand and hosted by the state's congressional delegation, Williams  vowed to "destroy that Republican crowd so bad that they won't be able to find a Rubel in the rubble."

Endorsements 
Phillips obtained the endorsement of the Mississippi Freedom Democratic Party, which sent a rival delegation to the 1964 national party convention in Atlantic City, New Jersey, but he repudiated the support of that group. The Freedom Democrats backed Phillips because he had expressed doubts that Williams as governor would be able to fight the desegregation policies of the then United States Department of Health, Education and Welfare.
 
As in 1963, the Greenville Delta Democrat-Times endorsed Phillips, having hailed his racial-moderation speech as "frank, honest, courageous ... the unvarnished truth." The paper claimed that Phillips had abandoned the earlier GOP efforts to "out-Dixiecrat the Dixiecrats," a reference to Strom Thurmond's 1948 presidential campaign. An unidentified Republican told U.S. News & World Report that the GOP had "thrown off the tag of being a racist, segregationist party in the South."

Results

County results

Footnotes

References
 

1967
gubernatorial
Mississippi
November 1967 events in the United States